Dawn Over the Drava  is a Bulgarian  war-drama film   from 1974, directed by Zako Heskiya.

Plot
The Liberation of the Chamber of Communists and the Communist Party of Bosnia and Herzegovina, on 8–9 September 1944,  Commander Boyan Vassilev received the Major General and the Assistant Chief of Command (Analogue Societies) in the Bulgarian Army. Him is ahead of the mistrust of the officership of the corps and the participation in the self-proclaimed for the Bulgarians of fights. Secondly, the warriors of the Draco in the Balatontone Operations.

Cast
 Georgi Georgiev-Getz as Boyan Vassilev
 Georgi Cherkelov as Colonel Demirev
 Peter Slabakov as Delcho
 Stoyan Gadev as big man
 Stefan Danailov as Lieutenant Bozhev

Awards
 Golden Rose Bulgarian Feature Film Festival (1974):
 Best Film
 Best Actor — Georgi Georgiev-Getz,  Georgi Cherkelov
 Best Screenplay — Pavel Vezhinov,  Rangel Ignatov 
 Best Cinematography — Krum Krumov
 Screenplay Award of  Union of Bulgarian Writers (1974):
  Pavel Vezhinov,  Rangel Ignatov

References

External links
 Българската национална филмотека

 Зарево над Драва — БНТ

Bulgarian World War II films
Bulgarian drama films
1974 war films
1974 drama films
1974 films